The Canisteo River is a  tributary of the Tioga River in western New York in the United States. It drains a dissected plateau, a portion of the northern Allegheny Plateau southwest of the Finger Lakes region, in the far northwestern reaches of the watershed of the Susquehanna River.

It flows east into northern Steuben County, New York, then generally southeast past Hornell, New York and Canisteo, New York.

The origin of the name of the river is obscure, likely from the Algonquian languages subfamily of American indigenous languages meaning either "pickerel" or "head of water".

History
The Canisteo River empties via the Tioga into the Chemung River, and it into the Susquehanna River. This allowed goods transported on the Canisteo River to reach the Atlantic via the ports of Havre de Grace and Perryville, Maryland, midway between Baltimore and Philadelphia. Prior to the opening of the Erie Canal in 1825, this was western New York State's most direct route for products going to market. Arkport, New York, on the Canisteo River, was the highest navigable point in the Susquehanna watershed.

Since the upper headwaters went through virgin forest, an early timber industry developed. Logs were floated down the river after being cut. Livestock and crops soon followed. 
 
In the floods of 1936, the river overflowed and inundated parts of the Canisteo and Hornell, leading to the construction of flood control systems in both communities. The only flooding since then was from Hurricane Agnes of 1972, in which the river destroyed the Erie Railroad line south of Hornell and New York Route 36 between Canisteo and Hornell, which was rebuilt further from the river.

See also
List of New York rivers
Canisteo (village), New York
Canisteo, New York

References

External links
Canisteo River history
Rootsweb: Canisteo River settlement
Ark Navigation on the Canisteo
Susquehanna River arks

Rivers of New York (state)
Tributaries of the Chemung River
Rivers of Allegany County, New York
Rivers of Steuben County, New York
Allegheny Plateau
Canisteo, New York